Perrine Le Buhanic (born 1 February 1982) is a French badminton player. In 2011 and 2016, she won French National Badminton Championships in the women's singles event.

Achievements

BWF International Challenge/Series 
Women's singles

Women's doubles

  BWF International Challenge tournament
  BWF International Series tournament
  BWF Future Series tournament

References

External links 
 

1982 births
Living people
People from Pont-l'Abbé
Sportspeople from Finistère
French female badminton players
Competitors at the 2013 Mediterranean Games
Mediterranean Games competitors for France